"Motorcycle Emptiness" is a song by Welsh alternative rock band Manic Street Preachers. It was released on 1 June 1992 through Columbia Records. It was the fifth single to be released from their debut album, Generation Terrorists.

Content 

The track is inspired by S.E. Hinton's book Rumble Fish, about biker gang culture. According to the band, the lyrics are an attack on the hollowness of a lifestyle centered around the consumerism which is offered by capitalism, describing how society expects young people to conform. The line "From feudal serf to spender" draws a direct parallel between slavery of peasants to the lord of their manor under the Feudal system in medieval times and the brand loyalty of people in modern capitalist societies, which the companies use to their advantage in pursuit of profit.

The song was derived from the early Manic Street Preachers songs "Go, Buzz Baby, Go" (with which it shares the chord structure and the phrase "Motorcycle Emptiness" late in the song over the verse chords) and "Behave Yourself Baby", a rough demo with a similar structure, that has the lines "All we want from you is the skin you live within", similar to "All we want from you are the kicks you've given us" in this song.

Some of the lyrics are taken from the poem "Neon Loneliness" (the first line of the chorus, "Under neon loneliness", is a direct lift) by Welsh poet Patrick Jones, the brother of Manics bass guitarist and lyricist Nicky Wire. "Motorcycle Emptiness" was also included on Forever Delayed, the Manics' greatest hits album, in October 2002, and released as a reissued single from the compilation in February 2003.

Release and reception 

"Motorcycle Emptiness" was released on 1 June 1992 by record label Columbia. The song reached number 17 in the UK Singles Chart on 13 June 1992. It remained there for another week and spent a total of eight weeks in the top 75, a fortnight longer than any other Generation Terrorists single, and a record not surpassed by the Manics until 1996's "A Design for Life".

In 2003, a re-issue CD containing the title track, "4 Ever Delayed" and "Little Baby Nothing (Acoustic)" was released in Europe as promotion for the band's Forever Delayed greatest hits compilation.

Awarding it 'Best New Single' in Smash Hits, Tom Doyle wrote: "Stripped of their punky backing, the Manics take a bit of a breather with this rousing classic of a tune which even features plucked violins!" He added: "[The single] proves that the Manics are much more than simply a punk parody and that they are capable of occasional brilliance."

Music video 

The video was filmed during a promotional visit to Japan in various locations, including the Shibuya Crossing and Cosmo Clock 21. It features the whole band, but with Bradfield appearing most, standing stationary and performing the song as crowds surge around him. The band appear in non-sequential shots, exploring the sites of Japan. At one point, Edwards appears trying to gain the attention of a tortoise.

Remix 

The song was remixed by Apollo-440 under their alternative name Stealth Sonic Orchestra as a piece of classical-style music. This remix was available as a track on the single "Australia" (taken from their 1996 album Everything Must Go), and was also used by T-Mobile for an advertising campaign in 2003.

Contestant David Martin performed an acoustic version in 2002 during the knockout stages of the hit UK reality show, Fame Academy (series 1) which was well received by the judges.

Legacy 

In 2006, Q magazine readers voted the song as the 88th best song ever.

Track listings

Charts

Certifications

References

External links 

 

1991 songs
1992 singles
British soft rock songs
Columbia Records singles
Manic Street Preachers songs
Political songs
Protest songs
Songs about loneliness
Songs against capitalism
Songs written by James Dean Bradfield
Songs written by Nicky Wire
Songs written by Richey Edwards
Songs written by Sean Moore (musician)